Bolesławiec may refer to the following Polish towns:
Bolesławiec, Greater Poland Voivodeship (west-central Poland)
Bolesławiec, Łódź Voivodeship (central Poland)
Bolesławiec in Lower Silesian Voivodeship (south-west Poland)

or the following Polish Gminas (districts):
Gmina Bolesławiec, Lower Silesian Voivodeship
Gmina Bolesławiec, Łódź Voivodeship

or the following Polish Powiat (County):
Bolesławiec County